Ogmore may refer to:

Places

South Wales 
Ogmore (Senedd constituency)
Ogmore, Vale of Glamorgan, an ancient hamlet
Ogmore (UK Parliament constituency)
Ogmore-by-Sea, a village
Ogmore Castle, near Ogmore-by-Sea
Ogmore Vale, a village in the County Borough of Bridgend
River Ogmore, a river

Australia 
 Ogmore, Queensland, Australia, a town

Other uses
 Mr Ogmore, character in Dylan Thomas's Under Milk Wood